Iain Rogerson (October 1960 – 13 October 2017) was a British actor best known for his portrayal of Harry Flagg in Coronation Street. Alongside appearances in Emmerdale, Doctors, Casualty, Heartbeat, Peak Practice, The Hello Girls, As Time Goes By, The Bill, People Like Us, Drop the Dead Donkey and Bloomin Marvellous, plus numerous film appearances including Mike Bassett: England Manager, To Kill A King, Bedazzled and Up 'n' Under, he did extensive theatre work including work with John Godber and Hull Truck Theatre.

Rogerson died on 13 October 2017 in Wrexham Maelor Hospital from "complications" relating to diabetes. Later a possible self administered insulin overdose was suspected.

References

External links 
 

1960 births
2017 deaths
Welsh male television actors
Welsh male soap opera actors
People from High Wycombe